Cecil Pouchet (died 13 September 1963) was a Trinidadian cricketer. He played in thirteen first-class matches for Trinidad and Tobago from 1938 to 1949.

See also
 List of Trinidadian representative cricketers

References

External links
 

Year of birth missing
1963 deaths
Trinidad and Tobago cricketers